Miao may refer to:

 Miao people, linguistically and culturally related group of people, recognized as such by the government of the People's Republic of China
 Miao script or Pollard script, writing system used for Miao languages
 Miao (Unicode block), a block of Unicode characters of the Pollard script
 Miào (庙), a Chinese temple
 Miáo (surname), a Chinese surname written 苗
 Miào (surname), a Chinese surname written 繆
 Miao, Chongming County (庙镇), town in Chongming District, Shanghai, China
 Miao, Changlang, town in Arunachal Pradesh, India
 Roman Catholic Diocese of Miao, in India
 Miao (album), album by Candy Lo
 "Mr. Miao", a short story by Pu Songling

See also 
Miao Rebellion (disambiguation)
 Miao Miao
 Meow (disambiguation)

Language and nationality disambiguation pages